Simoné Pretorius (née Nortmann; born 18 May 1990) is a South African film, television, and theatre actor, who is known for portraying Irma Humpel in the 2016 Afrikaans biographical film , for which she gained prominence and international recognition.
She is also renowned for her role as Jony in Kyknet's award-winning mockumentary, HOTEL, for which she received a nomination for a South African Film and Television Award for Best Actress in a TV Comedy in 2018. Her break-out role was as Nadia Croukamp on 7de Laan (2013–2015) which brought her an award from the Royalty Soapie Awards in 2014 for Best Newcomer.

Early life
Born on 18 May 1990 in Pretoria, South Africa, Nortmann hails from Afrikaans descent and is currently living in Johannesburg with her husband, Andries Levi Pretorius, an entrepreneur and accountant. Both her parents served in the South African Air Force. Her father, Hannes Nortmann, served in the South African Border War and was awarded the Honoris Crux Award for bravery in 1988. Nortmann is the only child of her parents who got divorced when she was age four. Her mother, Tinkie Nortmann, noticed her daughter's passion for acting when she one day climbed on top of KFC’s counter and started performing for the patrons. Nortmann was a natural leader and achiever in her school years, serving as Headgirl in Primary School as well as her High School, Hs Centurion, and passing matric with seven distinctions. She went on to earn a BDram degree in Theatre Studies from Stellenbosch University in 2012.

Career

Film:
After ending her contract at 7de Laan in 2015, Nortmann attended a three-week acting workshop led by Academy Award nominee and Broadway regular, Diane Venora, in California. Shortly after returning to South Africa she landed her first film role as the lead, Irma Humpel, in Huisgenoot Magazine's award-winning biopic, "Vir die Voëls" (2016) for which she received her first international nod by winning Best Actress at Tallgrass International Film Festival in 2017, where she was also invited to form part of the Female Filmmaker's panel discussion which was ordained after Rose McGowan cancelled her film debut at the festival after Harvey Weinstein case resurfaced. Nortmann also won Best Actress for the same film at local Huisgenoot Tempo Awards in 2017. She subsequently went on to star in South African box office hits and international film festival winning films "Vuil Wasgoed" (2017), "Stroomop" (2018), and "Wonderlus" (2018).

Television:
Nortmann made her television debut in the popular Afrikaans soap 7de Laan in 2013, playing Nadia Croukamp for which she was awarded Best Newcomer Award at the Royalty Soapie Awards (2014). Nortmann's television credits also include Kyknet's popular mockumentary, "Hotel" and she currently stars as Sr. René Spies in South African acclaimed soap, Binnelanders (2019).

Theatre:
Nortmann starred in The Sound of Music as Liesl von Trapp at the Wellington Theatre in 2011. She continued to take part in various productions and went on to star in her own one-woman play, Please Leave a Message, which showcased at various festivals throughout South Africa in 2017 and 2018.

Awards and nominations

Coaching
Nortmann started her own acting workshop in 2017 called Art of Acting South Africa.

Personal life
In 2018, she revealed that she was engaged to her partner, Andries Levi Pretorius, an accountant and entrepreneur, whom she has known since 2011. The two got engaged on 20 October 2018 and got married the following year on 23 February 2019.

See also
 List of South African actors
 Great South Africans
 Charlize Theron

References

External links
 
 
 Simoné Nortmann on TikTok

1990 births
Living people
21st-century South African actresses
South African stage actresses
South African film actresses
South African soap opera actresses
People from Gauteng
Stellenbosch University alumni
Afrikaner people